Tomorrow's Promises is an album by American jazz pianist Don Pullen recorded in 1976 and 1977 and released on the Atlantic label.

Reception
The Allmusic review by Scott Yanow awarded the album 4½ stars stating "This early Don Pullen recording helped introduce him to jazz listeners. The pianist is heard in a variety of settings... Pullen, a very rhythmic avant-gardist who can play inside or outside, was well-served by this release.

Track listing
All compositions by Don Pullen except as indicated
 "Big Alice" - 10:48 
 "Autumn Song" (George Adams) - 5:13 
 "Poodie Pie" (Morgan Burton, Sterling Magee, Don Pullen) - 6:36 
 "Kadji" - 8:16 
 "Last Year's Lies and Tomorrow's Promises" - 5:36 
 "Let's Be Friends" (Ira Warmack) - 7:38

Personnel
 Don Pullen — piano, electric piano, clavinet 
George Adams — tenor saxophone, soprano saxophone, bass clarinet, flute
Michal Urbaniak — violin (track 1)
Randy Brecker (track 1), Hannibal Marvin Peterson (tracks 2-4) — trumpet
Roland Prince, Sterling Magee - guitar (tracks 1, 3 & 4) 
İlhan Mimaroğlu — electronics (tracks 2 & 3)
John Flippin — electric bass (track 1) 
Alex Blake — bass (tracks 2-4 & 6)
Bobby Battle — drums, percussion (tracks 1-4 & 6)
Tyronne Walker — drums (track 1)
Ray Mantilla — percussion (tracks 1-4)
Rita DaCosta — vocals (track 6)

References

1977 albums
Don Pullen albums
Atlantic Records albums